El Milagro, Quintana Roo is one of the communities in the municipality of Benito Juarez, Quintana Roo.  It is effectively a commuter suburb of Cancun.

References 

Populated places in Quintana Roo